AM Gold is the eleventh studio album by American pop rock band Train, released on May 20, 2022, through Columbia Records. To date, AM Gold is the first Train album of original material not to chart on the Billboard 200 albums chart.

Background
On February 16, 2022, Train released a single called "AM Gold" and announced that an album of the same name would be released on May 20, 2022. They also uploaded a video to their YouTube channel showing Ken Jeong promoting the album. Frontman Pat Monahan says that, regarding the album, "writing songs is hard. It's difficult to create something that you love and then other people love as well. Writing songs for two and a half years in front of video screens instead of being in the presence of other humans has been a long, strange trip. And now here we are. It has to start with love. Love that goes into work comes out of work. We love (the title track), this album, and our fans. Thank you for waiting so long for us. I think it was worth it. AM Gold! Here we go!"

Promotion
Other than the lead single, "AM Gold", the album was preceded by three promotional singles. These songs were "Running Back (Trying to Talk to You)", released on April 14, 2022, "Turn the Radio Up" featuring Jewel, released on May 6, 2022, and "Cleopatra" featuring Sofía Reyes, released on May 18, 2022.

Critical reception

Stephen Thomas Erlewine of AllMusic gave AM Gold a positive review, stating that "Train makes maximalist pop music, the kind designed to be heard and sold at big-box stores, a sensibility that's rare in 2022, which is why AM Gold delivers a very particular kind of retro good times.

Tour
The band subsequently announced the AM Gold Tour with Jewel and Blues Traveler, with a few select shows with Thunderstorm Artis and Will Anderson. The tour began on June 8, 2022, in Mansfield, Massachusetts.

Track listing

Personnel
Train
 Jerry Becker – guitar, keyboards, production 
 Nikita Houston – background vocals 
 Taylor Locke – guitar
 Hector Maldonado – bass 
 Pat Monahan – lead vocals
 Matt Musty – drums, production
 Sakai Smith – background vocals

Musicians

 Wayne Bergeron – trumpet (1, 2, 7, 8)
 Charlie Bisharat – violin (4–6, 9)
 Jacob Braun – cello (4–6, 9)
 Zach Dellinger – viola (4–6, 9)
 Andrew Duckles – viola (4–6, 9)
 Bruce Dukov – violin (4–6, 9)
 Steve Erdody – cello (4–6, 9) 
 Jessica Guideri – violin (4–6, 9) 
 Dan Higgins – baritone saxophone (1, 2, 7, 8), alto saxophone (2, 7, 8)
 Paula Hochhalter – cello (4–6, 9)
 Luanne Homzy – violin (4–6, 9)
 Alex Iles – trombone (1, 2, 7, 8)

 Julia Laws – background vocals (3) 
 Natalie Leggett – violin (4–6, 9) 
 Maya Magub – violin (4–6, 9)
 Shawn Mann – viola (4–6, 9)
 Eric Marienthal – tenor saxophone (1, 2, 7, 8)
 Rob Mathes – conductor (1, 2, 4–9) 
 Rafael Padilla – percussion (1, 3, 7, 8, 10) 
 Alyssa Park – violin (4–6, 9)
 Molly Rogers – violin (4–6, 9)
 Rob Schaer – trumpet (1, 2, 7, 8)
 Terez Stanislav – violin (4–6, 9) 
 Josefina Vergara – violin (4–6, 9)

Technical
 Tristan Ableson – engineering assistance
 Jeff Balding – mixing
 Jordan Blackmon – miscellaneous production (6)
 Thom Bridges – co-production (3) 
 Jeff Fitzpatrick – engineering assistance (2, 4–7) 
 Lilly Graves – engineering assistance (2, 4–7)
 Chandler Harrod – engineering (2, 4–9)
 Todd Stopera – engineering
 Butch Walker – production, engineering

Charts

References

2022 albums
Albums produced by Butch Walker
Columbia Records albums
Train (band) albums